Somerton station is a station along the SEPTA West Trenton Line to Ewing, New Jersey. It is located at Bustleton and Philmont Avenues in the Somerton neighborhood of Philadelphia, Pennsylvania. In FY 2013, Somerton station had a weekday average of 676 boardings and 714 alightings. The station has off-street parking and a ticket office. There is also a handicapped-accessible platform.

Station layout
Somerton has two low-level side platforms with a mini high-level platform.

Gallery

References

External links

SEPTA - Somerton Station
 Station from Google Maps Street View

SEPTA Regional Rail stations
Former Reading Company stations